Waylak min Allah is the sixth studio album by Lebanese artist Amal Hijazi and was her first album after the birth of her son Karim in 2009. The album's first single is Waylak min Allah which has gained popularity and also some controversy, since it deals with political messages of a husband who deceives her, but although the lyrics speak about how he deceived her love, the video clip shows how he was also a political traitor.

Album information
The cover of this album shows Amal Hijazi with a cap, and very intense look, although after the birth of her son, it also shows her dedication to her art. This cover also shows the artistic side of Amal Hijazi in always releasing cover art which is very different from her previous work.

Track listing
 Bakhaf (I'm afraid)
 Ktir A'aleik (It's much for you)
 Kifak (How are you?)
 Biya'amelni (He treats me)
 A'ayno Aalay (His eyes are on me)
 Chou Baddak (What do you want?)
 Albi Me'azzab (My heart is hurt)
 Ma Tsammine (Don't call me)
 Bent Sghayara (A little girl)
 Bi 3younak Za'al (In your eyes is sadness)
 Helefna Bi Hobbena (We swore on our love)
 Waylak Min Allah (Be careful from God)

2010 albums
Arabic-language albums
Amal Hijazi albums
Rotana Records albums